Aikalainen is a 1984 Finnish film directed and written by Timo Linnasalo and Paavo Piskonen.

The film premiered on 16 March 1984 in Finland.

Cast
 Anita Heikkinen
 Pekka Laiho
 Heikki Mäkelä
 Kati Outinen
 Pentti Pajukallio
 Matti Pellonpää
 Sulevi Peltola
 Paavo Piskonen
 Rose-Marie Precht
 Erkki Saarela

See also
 List of Finnish films

External links
 

1980s Finnish-language films
Finnish drama films
1984 films